The second government of Francesc Antich was formed on 9 July 2007, following the latter's election as President of the Balearic Islands by the Parliament of the Balearic Islands on 4 July, as a result of the pact between centre and left-of-centre parties led by the Socialist Party of the Balearic Islands (PSIB-PSOE) after the 2007 regional election.

Investiture

Council of Government
The Government of the Balearic Islands was structured into the offices for the president, 14 ministries and the post of the spokesperson of the Government. The number of ministries was reduced to 12 after the ministries of Mobility and Sports were merged into the Environment and Presidency departments in February 2010, and to 10 after the ministries of Labour and Agriculture were merged into the Tourism and Presidency departments in June 2010.

Notes

References

Cabinets established in 2007
Cabinets disestablished in 2011
Cabinets of the Balearic Islands